Notre-Dame-de-Grâce—Westmount is a federal electoral district in Quebec. It encompasses areas formerly included in the electoral districts of Notre-Dame-de-Grâce—Lachine (40%), Westmount—Ville-Marie (59%) and Outremont (1%).

Notre-Dame-de-Grâce—Westmount was created by the 2012 federal electoral boundaries redistribution and was legally defined in the 2013 representation order. It came into effect upon the call of the 42nd Canadian federal election, which took place 19 October 2015.

Geography
The riding includes the towns of Westmount and Montreal West as well as part of the borough of Côte-des-Neiges–Notre-Dame-de-Grâce in Montreal.

Demographics

According to the Canada 2016 Census

 Languages (2016 mother tongue) : 41.5% English, 26.0% French, 3.6% Spanish, 3.2% Mandarin, 2.9% Arabic, 2.9% Farsi, 2.6% Italian, 2.1% Russian, 2.0% Romanian, 1.2% Korean, 1.1% Tagalog, 0.8% Polish, 0.8% German, 0.7% Greek, 0.7% Portuguese, 0.6% Cantonese, 0.4% Hungarian, 0.4% Bulgarian, 0.4% Vietnamese

Members of Parliament

This riding has elected the following Members of Parliament:

Election results

References

Côte-des-Neiges–Notre-Dame-de-Grâce
Westmount, Quebec
Montreal West, Quebec
Federal electoral districts of Montreal